Jeredy Hilterman (born 20 June 1998) is a professional footballer who plays as a forward for Eerste Divisie club Almere City. Born in the Netherlands, he plays for the Suriname national team.

Club career
He made his Eerste Divisie debut for Jong FC Utrecht on 21 August 2017 in a game against FC Oss.

On 8 July 2021, he signed a two-year contract with Emmen.

On 31 January 2022, Hilterman joined NAC Breda until the summer of 2024. After six months, he joined Almere City on a two-year contract with an option for an additional year, signing the deal on 12 July 2022.

International career
Hilterman debuted with the Surinamese national team in a friendly 1–0 loss to Thailand on 27 March 2022.

References

External links
 

1998 births
Living people
Footballers from Haarlem
Surinamese footballers
Suriname international footballers
Dutch footballers
Dutch sportspeople of Surinamese descent
Jong FC Utrecht players
FC Utrecht players
FC Emmen players
NAC Breda players
Almere City FC players
Eredivisie players
Eerste Divisie players
Association football forwards